The Second Vienna Award, also known as the Vienna Diktat, was the second of two territorial disputes that were arbitrated by Nazi Germany and Fascist Italy. On 30 August 1940, they assigned the territory of Northern Transylvania, including all of Maramureș and part of Crișana, from Romania to Hungary.

Background 

After World War I, the multiethnic Kingdom of Hungary was divided by the 1920 Treaty of Trianon to form several new nation states, but Hungary noted that the new state borders did not follow ethnic boundaries. The new nation state of Hungary was about a third the size of prewar Hungary, and millions of ethnic Hungarians were left outside the new Hungarian borders. Many historically-important areas of Hungary were assigned to other countries, and the distribution of natural resources was uneven. The various non-Hungarian populations generally saw the treaty as justice for their historically-marginalised nationalities, but the Hungarians considered the treaty to have been deeply unjust, a national humiliation and a real tragedy.

The treaty and its consequences dominated Hungarian public life and political culture in the interwar period, and the Hungarian government swung more and more to the right. Eventually, under Regent Miklós Horthy, Hungary established close relations with Benito Mussolini's Italy and Adolf Hitler's Germany.

The alliance with Nazi Germany allowed Hungary to regain southern Czechoslovakia in the First Vienna Award of 1938 and Subcarpathia in 1939. However, neither that nor the subsequent military conquest of Carpathian Ruthenia in 1939 satisfied Hungarian political ambitions. The awards allocated only a fraction of the territories lost by the Treaty of Trianon, and the loss resented the most by the Hungarians was that of Transylvania, which had been ceded to Romania.

In late June 1940, the Romanian government gave in to a Soviet ultimatum and allowed Moscow to take over both Bessarabia and Northern Bukovina, which had been incorporated into Romania after World War I, as well as the Hertsa region. The territorial loss was dreadful from its perspective, the Romanian government preferred that to a military conflict, which it knew it could not win, with the Soviets. However, the Hungarian government interpreted the fact that Romania had permanently given up some areas as an admission that it was no longer insisting on keeping its national territory intact under pressure. The Soviet occupation of Bessarabia and Northern Bukovina thus inspired Budapest to escalate its efforts to resolve "the question of Transylvania". Hungary hoped to gain as much of Transylvania as possible, but the Romanians would have none of that and submitted only a small region for consideration. Eventually, Hungarian-Romanian negotiations fell through entirely.

As a result, Romania and Hungary were "browbeaten" into accepting Axis arbitration.

Meanwhile, the Romanian government had acceded to Italy's request for territorial cessions to Bulgaria, another German-aligned neighbor. On 7 September, under the Treaty of Craiova, the "Cadrilater" (southern Dobruja) was ceded by Romania to Bulgaria.

Award
On 1 July 1940, Romania repudiated the Anglo-French guarantee of 13 April 1939, which had become worthless by the Fall of France. The next day, King Carol II addressed a letter to Hitler that suggested for Germany to send a military mission to Romania and to renew the alliance of 1883. Germany used Romania's new desperation to force a revision of the territorial settlement produced by the Paris Peace Conference of 1919 in favour of Germany's old allies: Hungary and Bulgaria. In an exchange of letters between Carol and Hitler (5–15 July), Carol insisted for no territorial exchange to occur without a population exchange, and Hitler conditioned German goodwill towards Romania on Romania's having good relations with Hungary and Bulgaria. The Romanian foreign minister was Mihail Manoilescu; the German minister plenipotentiary in Bucharest was Wilhelm Fabricius.

In accordance with German wishes, Romania began negotiations with Hungary at Turnu Severin on 16 August. Talks were broken off on 24 August. The German and Italian governments then proposed an arbitration, which was characterised in the minutes of the Romanian Crown Council of 29 August as "communications with an ultimative character made by the German and Italian governments".

The Romanians accepted, and Foreign Ministers Joachim von Ribbentrop of Germany and Galeazzo Ciano of Italy met on 30 August 1940 at the Belvedere Palace in Vienna. The treaty was signed by Hungarian Foreign Minister István Csáky and Romanian Foreign Minister Mihail Manoilescu. A Romanian crown council met overnight on 30–31 August to accept the arbitration. At the meeting, Iuliu Maniu demanded for Carol to abdicate and for the Romanian Army to resist the Hungarian takeover of northern Transylvania. His demands were pragmatically rejected.

Population statistics in Northern Transylvania and the changes after the award are presented in detail in the next section. The rest of Transylvania, known as Southern Transylvania, with 2,274,600 Romanians and 363,200 Hungarians, remained part of Romania.

The text of the Second Vienna Award 
  The final route of the border line, which separates Romania from Hungary, will correspond to the one marked on the geographical map attached here. A Romanian-Hungarian commission will determine the details of the route on the spot.
  The Romanian territory assigned to Hungary will be evacuated by Romanian troops within 15 days and handed over in good order. The different phases of the evacuation and the occupation, as well as their modalities will be fixed within a Romanian-Hungarian commission. The Hungarian and Romanian governments will ensure that the evacuation and occupation are carried out in full order. 
  All Romanian subjects, settled on this day on the territory to be ceded by Romania, acquire Hungarian nationality without any formalities. They will be allowed to opt in favor of the Romanian nationality within 6 months. Those people who will exercise this right, will leave the Hungarian territory within an additional period of 1 year and will be allowed to move into Romania. They will be able to take, without any hindrance, their movable property, to liquidate their immovable property, until the moment of their departure, and to take with them the resulting product. If the liquidation fails, these people will be compensated by Hungary. Hungary will resolve all issues related to the transplantation of optants in a broad and accommodating manner. 
  Romanian subjects of Hungarian race, established in the territory ceded in 1919 by Hungary to Romania and which remained under the sovereignty of the state, receive the right to opt for Hungarian nationality, within a period of 6 months. The principles set out in paragraph 3 shall also apply to people exercising this right.
  The Hungarian government solemnly undertakes to fully assimilate the Romanian people with other Hungarian subjects, who, on the basis of the above arbitration, will acquire Hungarian nationality. On the other hand, the Romanian government takes the same solemn commitment regarding its Hungarian subjects, who will remain on the Romanian territory. 
  The details resulting from the transfer of sovereignty will be regulated by a direct agreement between the Romanian and Hungarian governments. 
  Should any difficulties or doubts arise during the application of this arbitration, the Romanian and Hungarian governments will seek to reach an agreement directly. If no agreement is reached, the dispute will be submitted to the governments of the Reich and Italy, which will adopt a final solution.

Statistics
The 1930 Romanian census registered for the region a population of 2,393,300. In 1941, the Hungarian authorities conducted a new census, which registered a total population of 2,578,100. Both censuses asked language and nationality separately. According to the Romanian estimations in 1940 prior to the Second Vienna Award, about 1,300,000 people or 50% of the population was Romanian, while according to the Hungarian estimations in 1940 shortly following the Second Vienna Award, about 1,150,000 people or 48% of the population was Romanian. The results of both censuses are summarised in this table:

As Árpád E. Varga wrote, "the census conducted in 1930 met international statistical requirements in every respect. In order to establish nationality, the compilers devised a complex criterion system, unique at the time, which covered citizenship, nationality, native language (i.e. the language spoken in the family) and religion".

Apart from natural population growth, the differences between the censuses were caused by other complex reasons like migration, the assimilation of Jews and bilingual speakers. According to Hungarian registrations, 100,000 Hungarian refugees had arrived in Hungary from South Transylvania by January 1941. Most of them sought refuge in the north, and almost as many persons arrived from Hungary in the redeemed territories as those who moved to the Trianon Hungarian territory from South Transylvania.

As a result of the migrations, the number of North Transylvanian Hungarians increased by almost 100,000. To compensate, many Romanians were obliged to leave North Transylvania. Some 100,000 had left by February 1941, according to the incomplete registration of North Transylvanian refugees that was carried out by the Romanian government. Also, a fall in the total population suggests that a further 40,000 to 50,000 Romanians moved from North Transylvania to South Transylvania, including refugees who were omitted from the official registration for various reasons.

Hungarian gains by assimilation were balanced by losses for other groups of native speakers, such as Jews. The shift of languages was most typical among bilingual Romanians and Hungarians. On the other hand, in Máramaros and Szatmár Counties, dozens of settlements had many people who had declared themselves as Romanian but now identified themselves as Hungarian although they had not spoken any Hungarian even in 1910.

Aftermath 

The historian Keith Hitchins summarised the situation created by the award in his book "Rumania: 1866-1947 (Oxford History of Modern Europe), Oxford University Press, 1994":
Far from settling matters, the Vienna Award had exacerbated relations between Romania and Hungary. It did not solve the nationality problem by separating all Magyars from all Romanians. Some 1,150,000 to 1,300,000 Romanians, or 48 per cent to over 50 per cent of the population of the ceded territory, depending upon whose statistics are used, remained north of the new frontier, while about 500,000 Magyars (other Hungarian estimates go as high as 800,000, Romanian as low as 363,000) continued to reside in the south.

Romania had 14 days to evacuate the concerned territories and to assign them to Hungary. The Hungarian troops stepped across the Trianon borders on 5 September. The Regent of Hungary, Miklós Horthy, also attended in the entry. The troops reached the pre-Trianon border, which completed the territorial recovery process, on 13 September.

Generally, the ethnic Hungarian population welcomed the troops and regarded the separation from Romania as a liberation. The large ethnic Romanian community that found itself under the Hungarian occupation had nothing to celebrate, as it considered the Second Vienna Award a return to the long Hungarian rule. Upon entering the awarded territory, the Hungarian Army committed massacres against the Romanian population, including the following: 
 The Treznea massacre. On 9 September, in the village of Treznea, some Hungarian troops made a 4 km detour from the Zalău–Cluj route of the Hungarian Army and started firing at will on locals of all ages, killed many of them and partially destroyed the Orthodox church. The official Hungarian sources then recorded that 87 Romanians and 6 Jews were killed, including the local Orthodox priest and the Romanian local teacher with his wife, but some Romanian sources give as many as 263 locals who were killed. Some Hungarian historians claim that the killings came in retaliation after the Hungarian troops were fired upon by inhabitants after they had allegedly incited by the local Romanian Orthodox priest, but the claims are not supported by the accounts of several witnesses. The motivation of the 4 km detour of the Hungarian troops from the rest of the Hungarian Army is still a point of contention, but most evidence points towards the local noble Ferenc Bay, who had lost a large part of his estates to peasants in the 1920s, as most of the violence was directed towards the peasants living on his former estate.
 The Ip massacre. In similar circumstances, 159 local villagers were killed on 13 and 14 September 1940 by Hungarian troops in the village of Ip. The commander of the Hungarian troops who perpetrated the massacre of civilians was Lieutenant Zoltán Vasváry. On September 14, on the order of Vasvári, a pit 24 m by 4 m wide was dug in the village cemetery; the corpses of those killed in the massacre were buried head-to-head in two rows, with no religious ceremony.
The Nușfalău massacre occurred in the village of Nușfalău on 8 September 1940, when a Hungarian soldier with the support of some natives tortured and killed eleven ethnic Romanians (two women and nine men) from a nearby village who were passing through the area.

The exact number of casualties is disputed among some historians, but the existence of such events cannot be disputed.

The retreat of the Romanian Army was also not free from incidents, which were mostly damaging infrastructure and destroying public documents.

Carol II line

The Carol II fortified line had been built by Romania in the late 1930s at the order of King Carol II to defend the western border with Hungary. Stretching across , the line itself was not continuous but protected only the most likely routes towards inner Transylvania. It had 320 casemates: 80 built in 1938, 180 built in 1939 and the rest built in the first half of 1940. There was a distance of about 400 m between each casemate, all of which were made of reinforced concrete, with varying sizes, but all were armed with machine guns. The artillery was placed between the casemates themselves. In front of the casemates, there were rows of barbed wire, mine fields and one large antitank ditch, which in some places were filled with water. The firing from the casemates was calculated to be very dense and crossed to cause as many losses as possible to the enemy infantry. The role of the fortified line was not to stop incoming attacks but to delay them, to inflict as many losses as possible and to give time for the bulk of the Romanian Army to be mobilized.

After the Vienna Award, the entire line fell in the area allotted to Hungary. The Romanian troops evacuated as much equipment as possible, but the dug-in telephone lines could not be recovered and so were eventually used by the Hungarian Army. The Hungarians also salvaged as much metal as possible, which eventually amounted to a huge amount. After all of the useful equipment and materiel had been salvaged, the casemates were blown up by the Hungarians to prevent them from being used again.

Nullification
The Second Vienna Award was voided by the Allied Commission through  the Armistice Agreement with Romania (12 September 1944), whose Article 19 stipulated the following:
The Allied Governments regard the decision of the Vienna award regarding Transylvania as void and are agreed that Transylvania (the greater part thereof) should be returned to Romania, subject to confirmation at the peace settlement, and the Soviet Government agrees that Soviet forces shall take part for this purpose in joint military operations with Romania against Germany and Hungary.

That came after King Michael's Coup of 23 August 1944, when Romania changed sides and joined the Allies. Thereafter, the Romanian Army fought Nazi Germany and its allies, first in Romania and later in German-occupied Hungary and Slovakia, such as during the Budapest Offensive, the Siege of Budapest, the Bratislava–Brno Offensive, and the Prague Offensive. After the Battle of Carei on 25 October 1944, all the territory of Northern Transylvania was under the control of Romanian and Soviet troops. The Soviet Union kept administrative control until 9 March 1945, when Northern Transylvania reverted to Romania.

The 1947 Paris Peace Treaties reaffirmed the borders between Romania and Hungary, as they had been originally defined in the Treaty of Trianon, 27 years earlier.

See also 
First Vienna Award
Carpatho-Ukraine
Molotov–Ribbentrop Pact

References

Sources
 Árpád E. Varga. Erdély magyar népessége 1870-1995 között. Magyar Kisebbség 3–4, 1998, pp. 331–407.

 
 Alessandro Vagnini. German-Italian Commissions in Transylvania 1940-1943. A crucial key Study for Italian Diplomacy, Studia Universitatis Petru Maior, Historia Volume 9, 2009, pp. 165–187.

External links 

 Text of the Second Vienna Award
 Árpád E. Varga, Essays on Transylvania's  Demographic History. (Mainly in Hungarian, but also in English and Romanian.)
  Проблема Tрансильвании в отношениях СССР с союзниками по антигитлеровской коалиции (июнь 1941 г. — май 1945 г.) (an article on the Allies and the question of Transylvania)

Romania in World War II
History of Cluj-Napoca
Territorial disputes of Romania
Treaties of the Kingdom of Hungary (1920–1946)
Territorial disputes of Hungary
1940 in Europe
Arbitration cases
Treaties of the Kingdom of Romania
1940s in Vienna
Austria–Romania relations
Hungary–Romania relations
Territorial evolution of Hungary
August 1940 events
1940 in Hungary
August 1940 events in Romania
Treaties concluded in 1940
Treaties involving territorial changes
Territorial evolution of Romania
Germany–Romania relations
Germany–Hungary relations
Foreign relations of Nazi Germany